Mary Gordon may refer to:
Mary Gordon (prison inspector) (born 1861, British physician and prison inspector)
Mary Gordon (writer) (born 1949), American author
Mary Gordon (actress) (1882–1963), Scottish actress of the 1920s–50s who appeared in nearly 300 films
Mary Gordon (child advocate) (born 1947), Canadian social entrepreneur, author, and child advocate
Mary Gordon Ellis (1889–1934), educator and politician from South Carolina

See also
Mary Gordon-Watson (born 1948), British equestrian